Taufik Hidayat, S.H., M.H. (born July 22, 1959) is a retired brigadier general of the TNI-AD. Currently, he serves as chairman of the West Java DPRD from the Gerindra Party for the 2019-2024 period.

References

1959 births
Living people
Indonesian generals
Indonesian politicians